Jura Lanconia Levy (born 4 November 1990) is a Jamaican sprinter who specializes in the 100 metres and 200 metres. Her personal bests for the events are 11.10 seconds and 22.76 seconds, respectively.

She attended South Plains College and won four gold medals at the 2010 NJCAA championships, taking the 100 m and 200 m titles and two relay titles. She has won a number of medals at the CARIFTA Games including a relay gold in 2006, 200 m bronze in 2008 and a sprints gold/silver double at the 2009 CARIFTA Games.

At international level, she was a finalist in both the individual sprints at the 2007 World Youth Championships in Athletics and reached the 200 m final at the 2008 World Junior Championships in Athletics. Her last appearance in the age group categories came at the 2009 Pan American Junior Athletics Championships, where she was a double sprints bronze medallist and took a silver medal in the 4×100 m relay.

Levy began competing at the senior level in 2011. At the 2011 Central American and Caribbean Championships in Athletics in July she won silver medals over 100 m in the individual and relay competitions. She was selected to represent Jamaica in the 100 m at the 2011 World Championships in Athletics in Daegu and reached the semi-finals of the event. She ran in the heat stage of the women's relay and although she did not race in the final, she received a world silver medal as part of the team.

Personal bests

Achievements

References

External links

1990 births
Living people
Jamaican female sprinters
South Plains College alumni
World Athletics Championships athletes for Jamaica
World Athletics Championships medalists
Competitors at the 2018 Central American and Caribbean Games
Central American and Caribbean Games gold medalists for Jamaica
Central American and Caribbean Games medalists in athletics
21st-century Jamaican women